A list of works by Lucian (c. AD 125 – after AD 180), who wrote in Ancient Greek.

The order of the works is that of the Oxford Classical Texts edition. The English titles are taken from Loeb (alternative translations are sometimes given in brackets). The traditional Latin titles have also been given.

Some of the works are probably not by Lucian. Those whose attribution is almost certainly wrong are listed at the end. Other works whose authenticity is disputed are marked "[?]". Four works whose genuineness was once questioned but are now generally believed to be by Lucian are marked with an asterisk.

List of works

Editions
The works of Lucian in eight volumes, edited and translated by A.M.Harmon, K. Kilburn and M.D. Macleod (Loeb Classical Library, 1913–1967)
Luciani Opera, edited by Matthew Donald Macleod, 4 volumes (Oxford Classical Texts, 1972–1987)

Translations into English

Complete
Loeb edition by Harmon, Kilburn and Macleod (as above)
The Works of Lucian translated by H.W. Fowler and F. G. Fowler, four volumes (Oxford University Press, 1905)

Selections
Chattering Courtesans and Other Sardonic Sketches translated by Keith Sidwell (Penguin Classics, 2004)
Selected Dialogues translated by C. D. N. Costa (Oxford World's Classics, 2006)
On the Syrian Goddess, Jane Lightfoot, 2000, OUP, 1989

References

Secondary sources
The Oxford Companion to Classical Literature ed. M. C. Howatson (Second edition, OUP, 1989)

External links
 
 
 
 Lucian of Samosata Project – Articles, timeline, maps, library/texts, and themes 
 
 Works of Lucian of Samostata at sacred-texts.com
 Loeb Classical Library, volume three of Lucian's works with facing Greek text.
 Works of Lucian of Samosata only in the Greek original at Perseus Project .
 

Works by Lucian
2nd-century books
Cynicism
Lucian
Works by Lucian
Ancient Roman philosophical literature